Verhny Angoboy is a rural locality (a village) in Yaganovskoye Rural Settlement, Cherepovetsky District, Vologda Oblast, Russia. The population was 4 as of 2002.

Geography 
Verhny Angoboy is located 43 km northeast of Cherepovets (the district's administrative centre) by road. Nizhny Angoboy is the nearest rural locality.

References 

Rural localities in Cherepovetsky District